Dame Sylvia Lloyd Heal  (née Fox; born 20 July 1942) is a British Labour Party politician who was the Member of Parliament (MP) for Halesowen and Rowley Regis from 1997 to 2010, having previously been the MP for Mid Staffordshire from 1990 to 1992. She served as the First Deputy Chairman of Ways and Means and a Deputy Speaker of the House of Commons from 2000 until she stood down from
Parliament in 2010.

Early life
Born in Hawarden, Flintshire in north-east Wales, the daughter of Shotton steelworker John Lloyd-Fox and Ruby Hughes, she was educated at the Elfed Secondary Modern School (now  Elfed High School) on Mill Lane in Buckley, the Coleg Harlech, and at Swansea University, where she was awarded a BSc in Economics in 1968.

She worked as a medical records clerk at the Chester Royal Infirmary for six years from 1957. In 1968 she was appointed as a social worker with the Department of Employment for two years. For ten years from 1980 she worked as a social worker within a drug rehabilitation centre. During her parliamentary interregnum she worked as a young carers officer with the National Carers Association from 1992 to 1997.

Parliamentary career
She was a member of the Young Socialists National Council for four years from 1960, and was appointed as a Justice of the Peace in 1973. She was first elected to the House of Commons at the Mid Staffordshire by-election on 22 March 1990, which followed the suicide of the sitting Conservative MP John Heddle.  She won the seat with a majority of 9,449 on a massive 21% swing from Conservative to Labour in a contest that was fought largely on the single issue of the Poll Tax. She lost the Mid Staffordshire seat two years later at the 1992 general election when she was ousted by the Conservative Michael Fabricant by a majority of 6,236.  She was re-elected to Parliament at the 1997 general election for the new West Midlands seat of Halesowen and Rowley Regis with a majority of 10,337 and remained the MP in the 2001 and 2005 general elections.

In her first spell in Parliament she served for two years as a member of the education select committee. She was also promoted to the front bench by Neil Kinnock in 1991 as a spokeswoman for health and women. Following her re-election in 1997 she was appointed as the Parliamentary Private Secretary to the Secretary of State for Defence George Robertson and from 1999 his successor Geoff Hoon. She was appointed as a Deputy Speaker of the House in 2000, in which capacity she remained until her retirement from politics.

Sylvia Heal announced on 9 March 2010 that she would be stepping down at the 2010 general election, and was succeeded by Conservative James Morris as MP.

She was appointed Dame Commander of the Order of the British Empire (DBE) in the 2022 New Year Honours for political and public service.

Personal life
Heal is the sister of Ann Keen, who was a Labour MP from 1997 to 2010, and sister-in-law to Alan Keen, who was a Labour MP from 1992 until his death in 2011. She lives in Egham, Surrey, and she takes a keen interest in South Africa and enjoys gardening.

Publication
 Couldn't Care More: Study of Young Carers and their Needs by Jenny Frank, foreword by Sylvia Heal, 1995, The Children's Society

References

External links
 Guardian Unlimited Politics - Ask Aristotle: Sylvia Heal MP
 TheyWorkForYou.com - Sylvia Heal MP
 BBC politics

|-

|-

1942 births
Living people
Labour Party (UK) MPs for English constituencies
People from Hawarden
Female members of the Parliament of the United Kingdom for English constituencies
Alumni of Swansea University
UK MPs 1987–1992
UK MPs 1997–2001
UK MPs 2001–2005
UK MPs 2005–2010
Deputy Speakers of the British House of Commons
20th-century British women politicians
21st-century British women politicians
20th-century English women
20th-century English people
21st-century English women
21st-century English people
Women legislative deputy speakers
Dames Commander of the Order of the British Empire